WWE Smackville was a professional wrestling livestreaming event produced by WWE. It was held exclusively for wrestlers from the promotion's SmackDown brand division. A portion of the live event was livestreamed exclusively on the WWE Network as a one-hour special. It took place on July 27, 2019, at Bridgestone Arena in Nashville, Tennessee.

Nine matches were contested on the card, three of which were shown for the one-hour WWE Network special. In the main event of the non-televised live show, Bayley defeated Charlotte Flair and Alexa Bliss in a triple threat match to retain the SmackDown Women's Championship, while in the main event of the televised portion of the show, Kofi Kingston retained the WWE Championship in a triple threat match against Dolph Ziggler and Samoa Joe.

Production

Background
In 2015, WWE began to expand its content on the WWE Network by presenting televised house shows. These one-hour WWE Network-exclusive specials did not show the entire card, but only a select few matches. Smackville took place on July 27, 2019, at Bridgestone Arena in Nashville, Tennessee and featured wrestlers from the SmackDown brand. The one-hour WWE Network special of Smackville was livestreamed.

Storylines

The card included nine matches, three of which were shown for the one-hour WWE Network special. The matches resulted from scripted storylines, where wrestlers portrayed villains, heroes, or less distinguishable characters in scripted events that built tension and culminated in a wrestling match or series of matches. Results were predetermined by WWE's writers on the SmackDown brand, while storylines were produced on WWE's weekly television show SmackDown Live.

On the May 21 episode of SmackDown, Dolph Ziggler, who had been inactive since January's Royal Rumble event, made a surprise return and attacked Kofi Kingston. Ziggler, a Raw wrestler appearing via the wild card rule, later explained that it should have been him who got the opportunity to go to WrestleMania 35 and win the WWE Championship instead of Kingston. Ziggler, who was in turn moved to SmackDown, then lost to Kingston at both Super ShowDown and Stomping Grounds. On the June 24 episode of Raw, after Kingston had defeated both Kevin Owens and Sami Zayn in consecutive singles matches, Kingston was randomly attacked by Raw's Samoa Joe, who performed an "uranage" on Kingston. As referees tended to the champion, Joe returned and applied the "Coquina Clutch" on Kingston. Kingston would defeat Joe at Extreme Rules. On July 18, a WWE Championship Triple Threat match between the three wrestlers was announced for Smackville.

At Money in the Bank, Bayley won the women's Money in the Bank ladder match and later that night cashed in the contract on Charlotte Flair to win the SmackDown Women's Championship. On the June 4 episode of SmackDown, Flair competed in a triple threat match against Carmella and Raw's Alexa Bliss, who appeared via the wild card rule, in order to earn a rematch against Bayley for the title at Stomping Grounds. Bliss, however, won the match, thus Bliss earned the title match at Stomping Grounds, but lost. She and Cross then faced Bayley at Extreme Rules in a two-on-one handicap match for the title, but the two were defeated by Bayley. On July 18, a SmackDown Women's Championship triple threat match between Bayley, Flair, and Bliss was announced for Smackville, though this match was not shown on the WWE Network special.

During the Extreme Rules pre-show, Shinsuke Nakamura defeated Finn Bálor to win the Intercontinental Championship. A rematch was later scheduled for Smackville; however, Bálor was removed from the match on July 27 after suffering an undisclosed injury and was replaced by Ali.

In addition to the matches, a musical performance by Elias was also announced for the show.

Results

References

External links
Official Smackville website

Smackville
2019 in Tennessee
Events in Tennessee
July 2019 events in the United States
Professional wrestling in Nashville, Tennessee
WWE SmackDown